Giuseppe "Pino" Romualdi' (24 July 1913 – 21 May 1988) was an Italian right-wing politician who served both the Republican Fascist Party (PFR) and the Italian Social Movement (MSI). He was the subject of frequent rumours that he was the biological son of Benito Mussolini, although no proof has been given. Romualdi himself, who was from the same village as Mussolini, encouraged the rumour.

Biography

Before World War II
Romualdi was born in Predappio, near Forlì, the same comune of Mussolini.

He took a laurea in political science, serving as secretary of the Gruppi universitari fascisti in Forlì from 1936 to 1938, and then worked as a journalist. He also served as a member of the Chamber of Deputies under the Fascist regime.

Romualdi served as a soldier in the Italian Army in the campaigns in Ethiopia and during the Second World War in Greece and Albania, where he was an infantry captain. He returned to Italy in 1943 and became more prominent in political life with the foundation of the Italian Social Republic in 1943. Here he served as a delegate to the 1943 Congress of Verona and edited the Gazzetta di Parma newspaper. Shortly before the collapse of the Republic he was appointed vice-president of the PFR.

Post World War II  
Romualdi was one of the fascist contingent captured by Urbano Lazzaro's partisans at Dongo, Lombardy in April 1945. However he managed to escape capture and was sentenced to death in absentia. As a fugitive he became involved in terrorist activity and in 1946 was a founder of the neo-fascist Fasci di Azione Rivoluzionaria. However he left this movement, along with his close ally Pino Rauti at the end of the same year to become a leading figure in the new Italian Social Movement. Captured in 1948 his sentence was reduced to four years imprisonment and he was released in 1951, returning to his role as deputy secretary of the MSI.

He would go on to become associated with the 'liberal' wing of the party that helped to secure the leadership for Giorgio Almirante. He again served in the Chamber of Deputies from 1953 to 1979 and then in the Italian Senate from 1983 to 1987. He also edited the journals Lotta Politica, Il Popolo Italiano and Ardito at various times and as MSI deputy secretary oversaw the modernisation of the party's internal structure and played a leading role in drafting their nine-point programme in 1967.

European Parliament
Romualdi was elected to the European Parliament at the 1979 election and held his seat until his death. He became a leading figure within the far right, serving as vice chair of the Group of the European Right from 1984-1988. He was particularly prominent as a member of the European Parliament Committee on Foreign Affairs.

Romualdi died in Rome of cancer on 21 May 1988, on the same weekend as his former colleagues and fellow Italian Fascist leaders Dino Grandi and Giorgio Almirante. Like Romualdi, Grandi died on 21 May 1988, and Almirante died the following day.

References

1913 births
1988 deaths
People from Predappio
Italian neo-fascists
Italian military personnel of World War II
Italian military personnel of the Second Italo-Ethiopian War
People of the Italian Social Republic
Deaths from cancer in Lazio
Italian Social Movement MEPs
MEPs for Italy 1979–1984
MEPs for Italy 1984–1989
Italian male journalists
People sentenced to death in absentia
20th-century Italian journalists
20th-century Italian male writers